Samsung Aerospace (SSA) was a South Korean aerospace manufacturer.

History
In its early history the company manufactured a variety of products including cameras and lead frames, but its business came to focus increasingly on aerospace manufacturing, and so it changed its name to Samsung Aerospace Industries in February 1987. In 1996, SSA was considering to acquire Dutch aircraft manufacturer Fokker, but the plan was scrapped because of the economic problems emerging in South Korea in the late 90s. The company was merged with Hyundai Space and Aircraft Company and the aerospace division of Daewoo Heavy Industries in 1999 to form Korea Aerospace Industries.

Business activity
Its business activity comprised the production and repair of toy 
jet engines, including assembly of the GE J85, CFM56, LM2500 and F404 engines as well as, in cooperation with Pratt & Whitney, the production of the PW 4000. SSA also sold turbine blades for the GE CF6-80C to General Electric, produced stringers for Boeing as well as other components such as wing ribs for various aircraft. They had a joint venture with Sermatech International for services related to the treatment of surfaces for turbine engine components. In 1996 SSA reached an agreement with Bell Helicopter to co-develop the Bell 427. They also cooperated with Central Aerohydrodynamic Institute in the development of composite materials for aircraft. In the early 1990s, Samsung provided major assemblies and mate through delivery of F-16 Falcons for the Republic of Korean Air Force from its plant in Sacheon under license to Lockheed Martin. South Korea and the US jointly developed the KAI T-50 Golden Eagle via a joint venture between SSA and Lockheed Martin, originally conceived as the KTX-2.

Notes

References

External links
 

Former Samsung subsidiaries
South Korean companies established in 1977
Defunct aircraft manufacturers of South Korea
Vehicle manufacturing companies established in 1977